This is a list of the breeds of horse native to the Iberian peninsula, and considered in Portugal and Spain to have originated wholly or partly in those countries. Inclusion here does not necessarily imply that a breed is predominantly or exclusively of Iberian origin.

The Altér Real, Garrano, Lusitano, Ponei da Terceira and Sorraia are of Portuguese origin; the Garrano is equivalent to the Pura Raza Gallega of Spain. 

A Spanish Royal Decree of 2008 listed fourteen native breeds (Asturcón, Burguete, Caballo de Monte del País Vasco, Pura Raza Gallega, Pura Raza Española ("Andalusian"), Hispano-Árabe, Hispano-Bretón, Jaca Navarra, Losino, Mallorquín, Marismeño, Menorquín, Monchino and Pottoka), of which all but the Andalusian were at risk of extinction; the Spanish Trotter and Caballo de Deporte Español were listed separately. The Pirinenc Catalá was added in 2012, and the Caballo del las Retuertas in 2016. The Serrano received regional recognition from the Community of Madrid in 2011.

The horses of the peninsula are commonly classified in various groups or clades, confirmed by microsatellite studies. These may include: the northern or Atlantic Celtic ponies or small horses, which show similarities to British breeds such as the Exmoor Pony; the southern or Mediterranean breeds of Celtic origin, including the Mallorquín and Menorquín; the hot-blooded breeds, including the imported Arab and Thoroughbred, as well as the Spanish Trotter; and the Iberian horses, including the Pura Raza Española, the Lusitano, the Alter Réal and the Marismeño, which are closely related to the horses of North Africa. The Retuertas does not fall within any of these groups.

References 

 
 
Horse